Bad Boy is a 1935 American comedy film directed by John G. Blystone and written by Allen Rivkin. The film stars James Dunn, Dorothy Wilson, Louise Fazenda, Victor Kilian, John Wray and Luis Alberni. The film was released on October 25, 1935, by 20th Century Fox.

Plot
Cynical Eddie (James Dunn) spends most of his time hustling suckers at the pool hall, much to the dismay of his girlfriend, Sally (Dorothy Wilson). Her mother (Beulah Bondi) and stepfather (John Wray) disapprove of Eddie's lifestyle and lack of steady employment and demand that the two stop seeing each other. Instead, the couple secretly marry, but Eddie, despite his best efforts, has trouble finding a job. He becomes increasingly desperate, and eventually is on the verge of giving up entirely.

Cast 
James Dunn as Eddie Nolan
Dorothy Wilson as Sally Larkin 	
Louise Fazenda as Mrs. Harris 
Victor Kilian as Sid
John Wray as Fred Larkin
Luis Alberni as Tony
Beulah Bondi as Mrs. Larkin
Allen Vincent as Bob Carey

References

External links
 

1935 films
American comedy films
1935 comedy films
Fox Film films
20th Century Fox films
Films directed by John G. Blystone
American black-and-white films
Cue sports films
1930s English-language films
1930s American films